The General Directorate of Intelligence (GDI;) is the Afghan national intelligence, security and spy agency under the Islamic Emirate of Afghanistan.

Organization
Supreme Leader Hibatullah Akhundzada has claimed that the GDI reports directly to him, according to a statement released by Spokesman Zabiullah Mujahid in 2022 that purportedly quoted Akhundzada.

The GDI is divided into provincial level departments.

Activities
Since the Taliban takeover in August 2021, six hundred ISIS members, four kidnappers, dozens of mafia and other criminals have been arrested by the GDI.

Despite Taliban pledges to be tolerant, the GDI announced on March 2, 2022 that Afghan media must show a "press-friendly" image of the Taliban while they pressure reporters on rules that should not contradict Islamic values.

Directors
 Abdul Haq Wasiq (7 September 2021 – present)

References

2021 establishments in Afghanistan
Afghan intelligence agencies
Government agencies established in 2021
Law enforcement agencies of Afghanistan